Denticetopsis seducta is a species of whale catfish endemic to Brazil where it has a relatively wide, albeit scattered, distribution in the central and western portions of the Amazon basin and possibly the southwestern portions of the Orinoco River basin; it is relatively disjunct from the other species of Denticetopsis.  It grows to a length of 5.1 cm (2.0 inches).

References 
 

Cetopsidae
Catfish of South America
Freshwater fish of Brazil
Endemic fauna of Brazil
Fish of the Amazon basin
Fish described in 2005